Dhayari is a suburb of Pune, Maharashtra, India,

Geography
Dhayari is located at the intersection of Sinhagad Road and NH4 (Mumbai-Bangalore National Highway) in Pune city. It is one of the prime locations of Pune City as it is close to many important places of Pune. It is 8–9km from Swargate, 7–8km from Deccan, Fergusson College Road & Jangli Maharaj Road. It is around 20km from Hinjawadi IT Park. It is close to NH4 and an within easy reach of Warje and Chandani Chowk. It is green and surrounded by hills. 5km to its west is the Khadakwasla reservoir. Sinhagad fort is 20km from Dhayari. Dhayari is an upcoming residential area of Pune suburbs. Pune city ring road will pass through Dhayari. It is 13km from Pune Railway Station. Due to its location, Dhayari is a connecting point between Sinhagad fort and Pune. Symphony IT park is located near Dhayari. DSK Vishwa, Majestique Venice and Nanded City are major residential societies in Dhayari.

Transport
There are frequent buses from Swargate to Dhayari, the main buses running between Dhayari & Swargate are [Dhayari Maruti Mandir]. Within Dhayari, there are buses to DSK Vishwa. A Dhayari-Hadapsar Gadital corridor is planned for a Pune bus rapid transit (BRT) route.Bus service from Dhayari to Wagholi has started recently as well as other destinations are added now.

The closest railway station is the Pune railway station approximately 13 km.

The closest bus station is the Pune Swargate bus station. approx 9 km.

Swargate-Khadakwasla Metro is also proposed.

Medical facilities
Medical facilities within the Dhayari area include:
 Smt. Kashibai Navale Medical College & General Hospital, Narhe
 Deenanath Mangeshkar Hospital, Erandwane
 Cipla Foundation for Cancer, Warje.
 Mai Mangeshkar Hospital, Warje.
 Vinayak Hospital, Warje. 
 Lodha Hospital
Even Sinhagad Road, has many Hospital & Nursing rooms available within 5-10 Km range.

See also 
 Pune
 List of neighbourhoods in Pune
 Bhooj Adda Bengali Restaurant in Pune

References

Neighbourhoods in Pune